Kremsmünster is a town in Kirchdorf an der Krems District, in the Austrian state of Upper Austria. Settled in 777, it is home to the Kremsmünster Abbey.

The Abbey was founded 777 by Duke Tassilo III of Bavaria and is one of the oldest abbeys of central Europe. On a striking ice-age terrace above the town, it dominates the whole Krems valley. The monks (Order of Saint Benedict), lead a famous gymnasium which has existed since 1549, and an astronomical and geophysical observatory ("Mathematical tower"). The First Slovak Republic ceased to exist here when the exiled Slovak government capitulated to General Walton Walker leading the XX Corps of the 3rd US Army on 8 May 1945.

Science and culture
Kremsmünster is a traditional place of culture, astronomy and natural science. For instance, Placidus Fixlmillner (1721–1791), the first astronomer to compute the orbit of Uranus, was born and lived in Kremsmünster.

The observation tower itself (built 1749–1756) represents the first high-rise of Europe. In this vicinity the eldest geomagnetism station of the world was established, and also the first weather station of Austria-Hungary.

The nearby Gusterberg (450 m) is the fundamental point of the former national survey of Upper Austria. An observation tower at the summit marks the geoscientific importance of the mountain. It is also crossed by the Meridian arc Großenhain-Kremsmünster-Pola, an 800 km triangulation which was measured in the 19th century to determine the alpine curvature of the geoid.

Besides schools and the baroque library, Kremsmünster also has some institutions of adult education, e.g. Subiaco for Spiritual Exercises and a Vocational school. The castle Kremsegg houses a special museum of music instruments.

The monastery library (built 1680–1689 by Carlone) contains about 160,000 volumes. Among the 1,700 manuscripts is the Codex Millenarius, a Gospel Book written around 800 in Mondsee Abbey. 
The showpiece of the monastery's treasury is the Tassilo Chalice of about 770, created in copper and silver and holding 1.8 litres. It is still used in religious services, e.g. at Easter.

Architecture outside the monastery:
Gothic architecture: late gothic houses, gothic judge and city hall
Baroque: pilgrimage church Heiligenkreuz (1687–90, C.A. Carlone); Kalvarienberg (1736–38, J.M. Prunner/ B. Altomonte)
Rococo: filial church at Kirchberg (1753/54)
Castles: :de:Schloss Kremsegg and Schloss Achleiten/Kematen

Economy
Kremsmünster is also a place of modern technology with about 3,000 employees (62% of them in production), e.g. in
Petroleum industry (headquarters of Rohöl-Aufsuchungs Aktiengesellschaft in Krift)
Plastics industry (Greiner Holding AG, worldwide 7,000 employees) 
Packaging and glass industry (e.g. Gablonzer)
Construction companies, Arts and crafts
Summer tourism (20–25,000 nights).

References

External links

Kremsmünster Website (german)
Kremsmünster Abbey Website
Codex Millenarius
Kremsegg Castle & museum

Cities and towns in Kirchdorf an der Krems District